Mississippi Highway 454 (MS 454) is a state highway in western Mississippi. MS 454 starts at U.S. Highway 82 (US 82) and US 278. It travels eastward to its eastern terminus at MS 1. The road that became MS 454 was constructed in 1940 and opened the next year. MS 454 was designated in 1953, and has not changed significantly since.

Route description
MS 454 starts at the intersection of US 82 and US 278 and travels southeast. The road soon turns east, as it passes through vast farmland. MS 454 passes near its future alignment, and continues eastward. Less than  later, the road intersects Tanya Road and West Lake Lee Road, and passes by a small group of trees. About halfway through the route, the road crosses a creek, and travels through small forests. MS 454 ends at a T-intersection with MS 1. The whole highway is a paved, two-lane road. MS 454 is legally defined in Mississippi Code § 65-3-3. In 2012, Mississippi Department of Transportation (MDOT) calculated as many as 4,500 vehicles traveling west of MS 1, and as few as 3,100 vehicles traveling east of US 82/US 278.

History
A road from US 82 to MS 1 was constructed during 1940, and opened in 1941. The road was unsigned, and was already paved in concrete. It was designated as MS 454 by 1953. By 1999, US 278 became concurrent with US 82 through MS 454's western terminus. A bypass around Greenville has been planned in the 1990s, and construction began in 2008. It was partially built before funding stopped. A bridge for MS 454's future alignment has been built, with no roads connecting to it.

Major intersections

See also

References

454
Transportation in Washington County, Mississippi